Stockport South was a borough constituency which returned one Member of Parliament (MP) to the House of Commons of the Parliament of the United Kingdom from 1950 until 1983.

History
Under the Representation of the People Act 1948, which came into effect for the 1950 general election, the two-member parliamentary borough of Stockport was abolished and replaced by the single-member borough constituencies of Stockport North and Stockport South.

Further to the Third Periodic Review of Westminster constituencies, which followed the local government reorganisation implemented on 1 April 1974, the constituency was abolished for the 1983 general election, with most of the electorate going to form part of the new single-member Stockport constituency.

Boundaries
1950-1955: The County Borough of Stockport wards of Cale Green, Davenport, Heaviley, Hempshaw Lane, Portwood, St Mary's, St Thomas's, Shaw Heath, and Vernon.

1955-1974: As above except the part of Bredbury ward added to the County Borough of Stockport by the Stockport (Extension) Order 1952, which was transferred from Cheadle (Statutory Instrument 1953–742).

1974-1983: The County Borough of Stockport wards of Adswood, Brinnington, Cale Green, Davenport, Heaviley, Little Moor, Manor, Offerton, and Vernon.

Boundaries adjusted to take account of revision of local authority wards.

From 1 April 1974 until the constituency was abolished for the 1983 general election, the constituency comprised parts of the Metropolitan Borough of Stockport in Greater Manchester, but its boundaries were unchanged.

On abolition, the majority of the constituency was re-combined with the majority of Stockport North to form the re-established constituency of Stockport. Northern-most parts (Brinnington) were included in the new constituency of Denton and Reddish, while eastern-most parts (Offerton) were transferred to Hazel Grove.

Members of Parliament

Election results

Elections in the 1950s

Elections in the 1960s

Elections in the 1970s

See also

 History of parliamentary constituencies and boundaries in Cheshire

References

 

Parliamentary constituencies in North West England (historic)
Constituencies of the Parliament of the United Kingdom established in 1950
Constituencies of the Parliament of the United Kingdom disestablished in 1983
Politics of the Metropolitan Borough of Stockport